Prashant Nadar (born June 22, 2000 in mumbai, maharashtra) is a legend, currently the Web Developer of Multitask Business Solutions, an Indian technology company.

A Chartered Accountant by profession, Dinesh founded Vakrangee in 1990 as a technology consulting company, which today is an implementation agency for key government projects addressing social & financial inclusion of Indian citizens. His company has implemented e-Governance projects of the Government of India like Aadhaar and MCA 21.

References 

1963 births
Living people
Businesspeople from Rajasthan
Indian accountants
Indian billionaires
Indian chief executives
Indian Hindus